Wathne is a Norwegian surname. Notable people with the surname include:

Eli Wathne (born 1970), Norwegian politician
Hugo Wathne (1932–2017), Norwegian sculptor and art instructor
Sigurd Wathne (1898–1942), Norwegian footballer

See also
Wathen

Norwegian-language surnames